The 1894–95 United States Senate elections were held on various dates in various states. As these U.S. Senate elections were prior to the ratification of the Seventeenth Amendment in 1913, senators were chosen by state legislatures. Senators were elected over a wide range of time throughout 1894 and 1895, and a seat may have been filled months late or remained vacant due to legislative deadlock. In these elections, terms were up for the senators in Class 2.

The Republican Party gained plurality control of the Senate with Populist Party and Silver Party support.

Results summary 
Senate party division, 54th Congress (1895–1897)

 Plurality: Republican: 42
 Minority: Democrats: 39
 Other parties: Populist: 4, Silver: 2
 Total: 88
 Vacant: 1, due to failure to elect.  Later filled by a Democrat

Change in composition

Before the elections 
At the beginning of 1894, including early elections in Mississippi and Virginia.

Result of the general elections

Result of the special elections and party change

Race summaries

Elections during the 53rd Congress 
In these elections, the winners were seated during 1894 or in 1895 before March 4; ordered by election date.

Elections leading to the 54th Congress 
In these regular elections, the winners were elected for the term beginning March 4, 1895; ordered by state.

All of the elections involved the Class 2 seats.

Elections during the 54th Congress 
There were no elections in 1895 after March 4.

Alabama

Arkansas

California (special)

Colorado

Delaware

Georgia

Georgia (special)

Idaho

Illinois

Iowa

Kansas

Kentucky

Louisiana 

Interim appointee Donelson Caffery (D) was elected May 14, 1894 to the next term.  He was later (May 23, 1894) elected to finish the current term.

Louisiana (special, class 2) 

Randall L. Gibson (D) had been re-elected in 1889, but died December 15, 1892.  Donelson Caffery (D) was appointed by the Governor of Louisiana December 31, 1892 to continue the term, pending a special election.  On May 14, 1894 Caffery was elected to the next term, and on May 23, 1894 Caffery was elected to finish the current term.

Louisiana (special, class 3) 

Edward Douglass White (D) had been elected in 1891, but resigned March 12, 1894 when appointed to the U.S. Supreme Court.  Newton C. Blanchard (D) was appointed by the Governor of Louisiana March 12, 1894 to continue the term, pending a special election.  On May 23, 1894 Blanchard was elected to finish the current term, which would end March 3, 1897.

Maine

Massachusetts

Michigan

Michigan (special)

Minnesota

Mississippi

Mississippi (special)

Montana

Montana (special)

Nebraska

New Hampshire

New Jersey

North Carolina

North Carolina (special)

Oregon

Rhode Island

South Carolina

South Dakota

Tennessee

Texas

Virginia

Washington (special) 

John B. Allen (R) had been elected in 1889 as one of the first senators from Washington.  In 1893, however, the Washington State Legislature failed to elect a senator for the term beginning March 4, 1893. The governor appointed Allen to serve until March 20, 1893, but the Senate rejected his credentials.

John L. Wilson (R) was elected February 1, 1895 to finish the term, that would end March 3, 1899, taking his seat February 19, 1895.

West Virginia

Wyoming

Wyoming (special)

See also 
 1894 United States elections
 1894 United States House of Representatives elections
 53rd United States Congress
 54th United States Congress

Notes

References